The prominent old colonial American and Puritan Putnam family founded by John and Priscilla (Gould) Putnam in the 17th century, in Salem, Massachusetts. Many notable individuals are descendants of this family, including those listed below.

John Putnam was born about 1580 and came from Aston Abbotts, Buckinghamshire, England. He was married to Priscilla Gould and they settled in Salem. They were the parents of seven children: Elizabeth, Thomas, John, Nathaniel, Sara, Phoebe, and John. Their eldest son, Thomas, was the father of Thomas Putnam and Deacon Edward Putnam, who were involved in the Salem witch trials and were partially responsible for the executions of those convicted of witchcraft.

Notable members
Albigence Waldo Putnam (1799–1869), historian
Ann Putnam, Jr. (1679–1716), accuser at Salem Witchcraft trials
Brenda Putnam (1890–1975), sculptor
Carleton Putnam (c. 1902–1998), aviator, activist & author 
David Putnam (1898–1918), World War I air ace
Frederic Ward Putnam (1839–1915), American anthropologist, Harvard University
George Putnam (1889–1960), great-great-grandson of Judge Samuel Putnam, founder of Putnam Investments; his son George Putnam, retired chairman Putnam Investments; and grandson George Putnam III, Chairman, Putnam Investments
George D. Putnam (born 1948), screenwriter 
George Haven Putnam (1844–1930), book entrepreneur & publishing-family member
George Palmer Putnam (1814–1872), book entrepreneur
George P. Putnam (1887–1950), publisher, author, explorer, & publishing-family member; husband of aviator Amelia Earhart
Gideon Putnam (1763–1812), entrepreneur
Harriet Putnam Fowler (1842–1901), author & poet
Herbert Putnam (1861–1955), American library administrator & publishing-family member
Israel Putnam (1718–1790), American General
Jake Putnam (born 1956), Emmy award winning journalist, author, US Osuna Cup Team, Senior Olympic tennis player
James Jackson Putnam (1846–1918), neurologist
Mary Corinna Putnam Jacobi (1842–1906), American physician
Palmer Cosslett Putnam (1900–1984), Wind power pioneer and author, builder of the Smith–Putnam wind turbine
Brigadier General Paul A Putnam (1903-1982), American Brigadier General United States Marine Corps, Commander during the defense of wake Island during World War II
Justice Samuel Putnam (1768–1853), Massachusetts Supreme Court justice, who wrote the opinion in Harvard College v. Amory, which established the Prudent man rule in US Law
Robert Putnam (born 1941), American political scientist, Harvard University
Rufus Putnam (1738–1824), American soldier
Seth Putnam (1968–2011), American musician, from Newton, Massachusetts
Thomas Putnam (1651–1699), landowner in Salem during the Salem witch trials
William Lowell Putnam (1861–1923), American jurist & banker
George Putnam (newsman) (1914-2008), Emmy award winning investigative journalist & news broadcaster

Family tree

John Putnam (c 1580–1666) m. Priscilla Gould
Thomas Putnam (1614–1686)
Thomas Putnam (1652–1699), Salem witch trials accuser
Ann Putnam, Jr. (1679–1716), Salem witch trials accuser
Deacon Edward Putnam (1654–1747), Salem witch trials accuser
Edward Putnam (1682-1755)
Edward Putnam (1711-1800)
David Endicott Putnam (1752-1840)
David Putnam Jr. (1790-1879)
Alonzo W. Putnam (1828-1881)
Hiram M. Putnam (1856-1935)
George F. Putnam (1891-1946)
George Putnam (newsman) (1914-2008)
Elisha Putnam (1685–1745)
Rufus Putnam (1738–1824), General
Joseph Putnam (1669–1722) m. Elizabeth Porter (1673–1746)
David Putnam (1707–1768)
Israel Putnam (b. 1742)
Daniel Putnam
Benjamin Putnam
Frederick Putnam
David Putnam
David Putnam (1898–1918), World War I ace
William Putnam (b. 1749)
Andrew Putnam
George Putnam
George Putnam
William Lowell Putnam (1861–1923), lawyer and banker
Israel Putnam (1718–1790), General
Nathaniel Putnam (1619–1700)
Benjamin Putnam (1664–1715) m. Sarah Tarrant
Nathaniel Putnam (1686–1754)
Archelaus Putnam Sr. (b. 1718)
Nathaniel Putnam (1746–1800)
Nathaniel Putnam (1774–1849)
Nathaniel Putnam (1802–1886)
Abby Putnam Morrison (1848–)
Lillian Morrison Tingue (1885–)
Grace Tingue Curran (1907–1988)
Archelaus Putnam Jr. (1740–1800)
Caleb Putnam (1763–1826)
James Russell Putnam (1781–1841)
James Mercier Putnam (1823–1887), instrumental in colonizing British Honduras
James Henry Putnam (b. 1848), sugar plantation and railroad owner
Robert Emmet Putnam (1883–1959)
Richard Johnson Putnam (1913–2002), federal judge
"Bobby" Emmet Putnam (1919–2009)
Dr. Kimball Putnam Marshall (b. 1947), nationally recognized professor of business
Tarrant Putnam (1688–1732)
Gideon Putnam (1726–1811)
Samuel Putnam (1768–1853), Massachusetts Supreme Court justice
Daniel Putnam (b. 1696)
Daniel Putnam
Henry Putnam
Henry Putnam
George Palmer Putnam (1814–1872), book publisher m. Victorine Haven
Mary Corinna Putnam Jacobi (1842–1906), physician m. Abraham Jacobi (1830–1919), physician
George Haven Putnam (1844–1930), book publisher
Bertha Putnam (1872–1960), historian
George P. Putnam (1887–1950), writer, explorer m. Amelia Earhart (1897–1937), aviator
Palmer Cosslett Putnam (1900–1984), engineer
John Bishop Putnam (1849–1915), book publisher
Irving Putnam, book publisher
Edmund Whitman Putnam (1882–1941), book publisher, physician m. Ethel Wilson
Herbert Putnam (1861–1955), 8th Librarian of Congress
Brenda Putnam (1890–1975), sculptor
John Putnam (1627–1710)
James Putnam Sr. (1661–1727), bricklayer
James Putnam Jr. (b. 1689), bricklayer
Ebenezer Putnam
Ebenezer Putnam II
Ebenezer Putnam III
Frederic Ward Putnam (1839–1915), naturalist
Eben Putnam (1868–1933), historian and genealogist

References
Eben Putnam, A history of the Putnam family in England and America, 1908
G. Andrews Moriarty Jr., A.M., LL.B., F.S.A., The English Ancestry of John Putnam Of Salem, Massachusetts

 
American families